Coen Stolk (born 26 June 1997) is a Dutch professional basketball player for Landstede Hammers of the BNXT League. He also plays for the Netherlands national team.

Career 
A product of the youth academy, Stolk started his career playing for Landstede Zwolle before signing with Feyenoord, then known as Rotterdam Basketbal, in 2015.

Stolk averaged 6.7 points and 3.1 rebounds per game during the 2019–20 season. On 9 July 2020, Stolk extended his contract until 2022. In the 2021–22 season, he averaged a career-high 10.6 points per game with Feyenoord.

On 9 June 2022, Stolk signed with Landstede Hammers and thus returned to his former club.

National team career
Stolk has played for the Netherlands under-20 team at the 2016 FIBA U20 European Championship Division B in Greece. 

On 25 February 2023, Stolk made his debut for the Netherlands senior team in a home game against Georgia.

References

External links

1997 births
Living people
Dutch Basketball League players
Dutch men's basketball players
Feyenoord Basketball players
Landstede Hammers players
Shooting guards
Sportspeople from Dordrecht